Resh is the twentieth letter of the Semitic abjads, including Phoenician Rēsh , Hebrew Rēsh , Aramaic Rēsh , Syriac Rēsh ܪ, and Arabic  .

In most Semitic alphabets, the letter resh (and its equivalents) is quite similar to the letter dalet (and its equivalents). In the Syriac alphabet, the letters became so similar that now they are only distinguished by a dot: resh has a dot above the letter, and the otherwise identical dalet has a dot below the letter. In the Aramaic and Hebrew square alphabet, resh is a rounded single stroke while dalet is a right-angle of two strokes. The similarity led to the variant spellings of the name Nebuchadnezzar and Nebuchadrezzar.

The Phoenician letter gave rise to the Greek rho (Ρ/ρ), Etruscan , Latin R, and Cyrillic Р.

Origins
The word resh is usually assumed to have come from a pictogram of a head, ultimately reflecting Proto-Semitic *raʾ(i)š-. The word's East Semitic cognate, rēš-, was one possible phonetic reading of the Sumerian cuneiform sign for "head" (SAG 𒊕) in Akkadian.

Hebrew Resh

Hebrew spelling: 

In Hebrew, Resh represents a rhotic consonant that has different realizations for different dialects:
 In Modern Hebrew, the most common pronunciation is the voiced uvular fricative .
 Ashkenazi use sometimes a uvular trill  or an alveolar trill . English-speakers replace it sometimes with an alveolar approximant , as in English.
 Sephardic and Mizrahi use an alveolar trill , an alveolar flap  or uvular trill .

Resh, along with Ayin, Aleph, Hei, and Het, does not receive a dagesh by convention. In the Yemenite tradition, Resh is treated as most other consonants in that it can receive a dagesh hazak under certain circumstances. In the most widely accepted version of the Hebrew Bible, there are 17 instances of Resh being marked with a dagesh.

In gematria, Resh represents the number 200.

As abbreviation
Resh as an abbreviation can stand for Rabbi (or Rav, Rebbe, Rabban, Rabbenu, and other similar constructions).

Resh may be found after a person's name on a gravestone to indicate that the person had been a Rabbi or to indicate the other use of Rav, as a generic term for a teacher or a personal spiritual guide.

Spelling out
Resh is used in an Israeli phrase; after a child may say something false, one may say "B'Shin Quf, Resh" (With Shin, Quf, Resh). These letters spell Sheqer, which is the Hebrew word for a lie. It would be akin to an English speaker saying "That's an L-I-E."

Arabic rāʾ
The letter is named   in Arabic. It is written in several ways depending on its position in the word:

It ranges between an alveolar trill , an alveolar flap , and a uvular trill  (the last of which is only found in a few modern varieties). It is pronounced as a postalveolar approximant [ɹ̠] in the traditional dialect of Fes.

Derived letter in other languages 

The Unicode standard for Arabic scripts also lists a variant with a full stroke (Unicode character U+075b: ݛ), suggesting that this form is used in certain Northern and Western African languages and some dialects in Pakistan.

Character encodings

References

External links

Phoenician alphabet
Arabic letters
Hebrew letters